The San Giacomo Lighthouse is an active lighthouse at the root of the east wharf of the commercial harbour of Licata on the Channel of Sicily. The lighthouse takes its name from the homonymous castle once on the site, then later destroyed to make room for the seaport.

Description
The lantern can be reached by a spiral staircase of 129 steps lighted by five aligned windows. The tower and the lantern are white, the lantern dome is grey metallic. The lighthouse is completely automated and managed by the Marina Militare with the identification code number 2954 E.F.

See also
 List of lighthouses in Italy

References

External links

 Servizio Fari Marina Militare

Lighthouses in Italy
Buildings and structures in Sicily